The 2000 FIVB Women's World Olympic Qualification Tournament was played by eight countries to determine the last four competing teams for the 2000 Summer Olympics in Sydney, Australia. The tournament was held in Tokyo, Japan from June 17 to June 25, 2000. The top-four teams advance to the Olympic Games with one berth guaranteed for an Asian country.

Teams

Round robin
 Saturday 2000-06-17

 Sunday 2000-06-18

 Monday 2000-06-19

 Wednesday 2000-06-21

 Thursday 2000-06-22

 Saturday 2000-06-24

 Sunday 2000-06-25

Final ranking

 South Korea is counted as The Asian Continental Qualification Tournament Champion since it is the best Asian team except the winner.
 It was the first time Japan did not qualify to the Olympics since volleyball became official at the 1964 Summer Olympics in Tokyo.''

Awards

Best Scorer:

Best Spiker:

Best Blocker:

Best Server:

Best Digger:

Best Setter:

Best Receiver:

References
 Results
 Best Players

O
V
V
Q
Qualification for volleyball competitions
Vol